Arachania is a village in the Cerro Largo Department of Uruguay.

References 

Populated places in the Cerro Largo Department